Hail! Hail! Rock 'n' Roll is a 1987 documentary film directed by Taylor Hackford that chronicles two 1986 concerts celebrating rock and roll musician Chuck Berry's 60th birthday. A soundtrack album was released in October 1987 on the MCA label. The name comes from a line in Berry's song "School Days".

The two concerts were held on October 16, 1986, at the Fox Theatre in St. Louis; among the artists performing with Berry were Linda Ronstadt, Keith Richards, Eric Clapton, Robert Cray, Etta James, Johnnie Johnson, Steve Jordan, Bobby Keys, Julian Lennon, and Joey Spampinato of NRBQ. Along with concert footage, the film also features scenes from the rehearsals for the shows, interviews with Berry and members of his family, and "talking-head"-type appearances from a number of musicians, including Bo Diddley, The Everly Brothers, John Lennon (archival footage), Jerry Lee Lewis, Roy Orbison, Little Richard and Bruce Springsteen.

Track listing

"Come On" (Chuck Berry) rehearsal at Berry's home, Wentzville 8.-14.10.86
"Carol" (Chuck Berry) rehearsal at Berry's home, Wentzville 8.-14.10.86
"It Don't Take But a Few Minutes" (Chuck Berry) -rehearsal at Berry's home, Wentzville 8.-14.10.86
"I'm Through With Love" (Gus Kahn/Matt Malneck/Fud Livingston) rehearsal at Berry's home, Wentzville 8.-14.10.86
"Roll Over Beethoven" (Chuck Berry) (with Robert Cray on guitar)
"Almost Grown" (Chuck Berry)
"Back in the U.S.A." (Chuck Berry) (with Linda Ronstadt on vocals and Robert Cray on guitar)
"Sweet Little Sixteen" (Chuck Berry)
"No Money Down" (Chuck Berry)
"Nadine" (Chuck Berry)
"Johnny B. Goode" (Chuck Berry) (with Julian Lennon on vocals)
"Memphis, Tennessee" (Chuck Berry)
"Little Queenie" (Chuck Berry)
"Brown Eyed Handsome Man" (Chuck Berry) (with Robert Cray on guitar and vocals)
"Too Much Monkey Business" (Chuck Berry)
"No Particular Place to Go" (Chuck Berry)
"Wee Wee Hours" (Chuck Berry) (with Eric Clapton on guitar and vocals)
"Rock and Roll Music" (Chuck Berry) (with Etta James on vocals, Keith Richards, Robert Cray and Eric Clapton on guitars)
"School Days" (Chuck Berry) (with Ingrid Berry on vocals, Eric Clapton, Robert Cray and Joe Walsh (uncredited) on guitars)

Bonus rehearsals on the DVD
"Guitar Jam" (Chuck Berry/Keith Richards/Eric Clapton)
"Mean Old World" (Walter Jacobs)
"It Don't Take But a Few Minutes" (Chuck Berry)
"Hoochie Coochie Gal" (Willie Dixon/Etta James)
"A Cottage for Sale" (Willard Robison/Larry Conley)

The band
 Chuck Berry – vocals, electric guitar
 Keith Richards – electric guitar, backing vocals
 Johnnie Johnson – piano
 Chuck Leavell – organ
 Joey Spampinato – bass guitar, backing vocals
 Steve Jordan – drums, backing vocals
 Bobby Keys – tenor saxophone
 Ingrid Berry – backing vocals
 Eric Clapton, Robert Cray – electric guitar, vocals
 Etta James, Julian Lennon, Linda Ronstadt – vocals

As told in the interview section of the Bonus DVD, Berry shot his voice at a cold open air concert the day before the filming of the movie. All of his lead vocals are therefore overdubbed in a studio.

References

External links
 
 
 
 

1987 films
Films directed by Taylor Hackford
Rockumentaries
Concert films
American documentary films
1987 documentary films
Chuck Berry
Films shot in St. Louis
1980s English-language films
1980s American films